The Yushima Formation, also known as the Tatsunokuchi Formation, is a palaeontological formation located in Japan. It dates to the Lower Pliocene period.

See also 
 List of fossil sites

Further reading 
  (1993); Wildlife of Gondwana. Reed. 

Geologic formations of Japan
Neogene System of Asia
Neogene Japan
Pliocene Series
Pliocene paleontological sites
Paleontology in Japan